Bezinghem is a commune in the Pas-de-Calais department in the Hauts-de-France region of France.

Geography
A small village situated some 15 miles(24 km) southeast of Boulogne-sur-Mer, on the D127E road.

Population

See also
Communes of the Pas-de-Calais department

References

Communes of Pas-de-Calais